Bill Kann (born August 13, 1993) is an American professional stock car racing driver. He currently competes part-time in the NASCAR K&N Pro Series West, driving the No. 18 Chevrolet SS.

Motorsports career results

NASCAR
(key) (Bold – Pole position awarded by qualifying time. Italics – Pole position earned by points standings or practice time. * – Most laps led.)

K&N Pro Series West

References

External links

1993 births
NASCAR drivers
Sportspeople from Scottsdale, Arizona
Living people
Racing drivers from Arizona
Racing drivers from Phoenix, Arizona